Triángulo may refer to:

 Triángulo (album), an album by Pappo's Blues
 Triángulo (telenovela), a Mexican telenovela